McCarran Field may refer to:
Harry Reid International Airport, the former Alamo Airport named for Senator Pat McCarran from 1948 to 2021
Nellis Air Force Base, a 1929 airport that was named McCarran Field prior to World War II

Airports established in 1929